This is a list of the deputy speakers of the People's Representative Council of Indonesia. At the start of each five-year period, multiple deputies are elected from the members of the house. The current leadership of the body has four deputy speakers.

List

See also 
 House of Representatives
 List of speakers of the People's Representative Council
 List of speakers of the People's Consultative Assembly
 List of speakers of the Regional Representative Council of Indonesia

Notes

References 

Lists of political office-holders in Indonesia